The Cima di Broglio is a mountain of the Swiss Lepontine Alps, located east of Cevio in the canton of Ticino. It lies south of Monte Zucchero, on the range between the Valle Maggia and the Valle Verzasca.

References

External links
 Cima di Broglio on Hikr

Mountains of the Alps
Mountains of Switzerland
Mountains of Ticino
Lepontine Alps